Indian National Trade Union Congress (INTUC) is a national trade union in India. It was founded on 3 May 1947 and is affiliated with the International Trade Union Confederation. According to provisional statistics from the Ministry of Labour, INTUC had a membership of 33.95 million in 2013, making it the largest Trade Union in India.

Early years
The foundation of INTUC on 3 May 1947 just 3 months before India attained independence.

Acharya JB Kripalani, who was then President of the Indian National Congress inaugurated the Founding conference of INTUC. Among the distinguished leaders who attended the opening session were Pandit Jawaharlal Nehru,  Shankarrao Deo, Jagjivan Ram, B. G. Kher, OP Mehtab, Aruna Asaf Ali, Ram Manohar Lohia, Ashoka Mehta, Ramchandra Sakharam Ruikar, Maniben Patel and  other prominent trade unionists.

Under the guidance of Mahatma Gandhi, the founding fathers in their wisdom preferred to let the INTUC have an independent identity with its own constitution, while at the same time functioning as an arm of the Congress.

INTUC Congress relationship

Since inception, INTUC has been maintaining very close relationship with AICC. On several occasions there have been discussions over the relationship between INTUC and AICC and the need for having continuous dialogue between the two organisations on issues of mutual interests. In order to have regular interaction between the INTUC & AICC a five-member committee was appointed by the AICC in 1967 and Gulzarilal Nanda was the convener. Similarly during 2002, an advisory committee was formed under the chairmanship of Pranab Mukherjee. Three general secretaries represented AICC in the committee.  On behalf of INTUC, G. Sanjeeva Reddy president, then general secretary and two vice-presidents represented. Later G. Sanjeeva Reddy was included in the CWC.

Objectives of INTUC

To establish an order of society which is free from hindrance in the way on an all round development of its individual members, which fosters the growth of human personality in all its aspects and goes to the utmost limit in progressively eliminating social political or economic exploitation and inequality, the profit motive in the economic activity and organisation of society and the anti-social concentration in any form.
 	
To place industry under national ownership and control in suitable form in order to realise the aforesaid objectives in the quickest time.
 
To organise society in such a manner as to ensure full employment and the best utilisation of its manpower and other resources.
 	
To secure increasing association of the worker in the administration of industry and their full participation in its control.
 
To promote generally the social civic and political interest of the working class
 	
To secure an effective and complete organisation of all categories of workers, including agricultural labour.
 
To guide and co-ordinate the activities of the affiliated organisations.
 
To assist and co-ordinate the activities of the affiliated organisations.
 
To assist in the formation of trade unions.
	
To promote the organisation of workers of each industry on a nationwide basis.
 
To assist in the formation of Regional or Pradesh Branches or Federations.

To secure speedy improvement of conditions of work and life and of the status of the workers in industry and society.
 
To obtain for the workers various measures of social security, including adequate provision in respect of accidents, maternity, sickness, old age and unemployment.
 	
To secure a living wage for every worker in normal employment and to bring about a progressive improvement in the workers standard of living.
 
To regulate hours and other conditions of work in keeping with the conditions of the workers and to ensure the proper enforcement of legislation for the protection and up-lift of labour.
 	
To establish just industrial relations.
 	
To secure redressal of grievances, without stoppages of work, by means of negotiations and conciliation and failing these by arbitration or adjudication.
 
To take recourse to other legitimate method, including strikes or any suitable form of satyagraha, where adjudication is not applied and settlement of disputes within a reasonable time by arbitration is not available for the redress of grievances.
 	
To make necessary arrangements for the efficient conduct satisfactory and speedy conclusion of authorised strikes or satyagraha.
 
To foster the spirit of solidarity, service, brotherhood co-operation and mutual help among the workers.
 
To develop in the workers a sense of responsibility towards the industry and community.

To raise the workers' standard of efficiency and discipline.

Affiliates
The INTUC's current affiliates are:

 All India National Life Insurance Employees' Federation
 Central Government Employees' Confederation
 Federation of National Postal Organisations
 Indian National Bank Employees' Federations
 Indian National Bank Officers' Congress
 Indian National Building Construction, Forest & Woodworkers' Federation
 Indian National Cement Workers' Federation
 Indian National Chemical Workers' Federation
 Indian National Defence Workers' Federation
 Indian National Electricity Workers' Federation
 Indian National Food and Drink Workers' Federation
 Indian National Jute Workers' Federation
 Indian National Metal Workers' Federation
 Indian National Mineworkers' Federation
 Indian National Municipal and Local Bodies Workers' Federation
 Indian National Paper Mill Workers' Federation
 Indian National Plantation Workers' Federation
 Indian National Port and Dock Workers' Federation
 Indian National Rural Labour Federation
 Indian National Salaried Employees' and Professional Workers' Federation
 Indian National Sugar Mill Workers' Federation
 Indian National Textile Workers' Federation
 Indian National Transport Workers' Federation
 National Federation of Indian Railwaymen
 National Federation of Petroleum Workers
 National Federation of Telecommunication Organisations

Leadership

Presidents

See also

Trade unions in India
Indian national congress

References

External links
 Official site

Trade unions in India
1947 establishments in India
 
ICFTU Asia and Pacific Regional Organisation
Indian National Congress organisations
Trade unions established in 1947